This article contains statistics of Veikkausliiga in the 1993 season.

Overview
Preliminary Stage is performed in 12 teams, and higher 8 teams go into Championship Group. Lower 4 teams fought in promotion/relegation group with higher 4 teams of Ykkönen.

FC Jazz Pori won the championship.

Preliminary stage

Table

Results

Championship group

Table

Results

Promotion/relegation group

Table

NB: Top six to Premier Division 1994, the rest to Division One 1994.

See also
Ykkönen (Tier 2)

Footnotes

References
Finland - List of final tables (RSSSF)

Veikkausliiga seasons
Fin
Fin
1